Doctor Krishna is a 1989 Indian Kannada drama film, directed and written by Phani Ramachandra. The film stars Vishnuvardhan in the title role, along with Suman Ranganathan and Tara in leading roles. The music of the film was composed by Rajan–Nagendra.

Produced by Vijaya Shankar Bhat under Satya Sai Movies banner, the film was released in 1989 and met with positive response from critics and audience. Actress Leelavathi won the State award for Best Supporting actress and the film was nominated under best film category.

Cast 
 Vishnuvardhan as Dr. Krishna
 Suman Ranganathan as Swati
 Tara as Chanchala
 Umashree
 G. K. Govinda Rao
 Leelavathi
 Ramesh Bhat
 Vijay Kashi
 Kavya Krishnamurthy
 Aparna

Soundtrack 
The film's soundtrack was composed by Rajan–Nagendra.

References

External links 
 

1989 films
1980s Kannada-language films
Indian romantic drama films
1989 romantic drama films
Films scored by Rajan–Nagendra
Films directed by Phani Ramachandra